RGO may refer to:

Organisations
 Rada Główna Opiekuńcza (Central Welfare Council), a Polish social organization during the German occupation of WWI and WWII
 Revolutionäre Gewerkschafts Opposition (Revolutionary Union Opposition), a Communist trade union during Germany's Weimar Republic
 Russkoye Geograficheskoye Obshchestvo (Russian Geographical Society), a Russian scholarly association

Places
 Royal Greenwich Observatory (now Royal Observatory, Greenwich), Greenwich Park, London, England
 Orang Airport, North Hamgyong Province, North Korea (by IATA code)

Technology
 Reciprocating gait orthosis, a type of leg brace
 Reduced graphene oxide, a form of graphene
 Ruchnaya Granata Oboronitel'naya (Hand Grenade Defensive), a Soviet weapon